Opposition to the War in Afghanistan (2001–2021) stemmed from numerous factors, including the view that the United States invasion of Afghanistan was illegal under international law and constituted an unjustified aggression, the view that the continued military presence constituted a foreign military occupation, the view that the war did little to prevent terrorism but increased its likelihood, and views on the involvement of geo-political and corporate interests. Also giving rise to opposition to the war were civilian casualties, the cost to taxpayers, and the length of the war to date.

Disputed legality of the US invasion

Opponents of the war have claimed that the attack on Afghanistan was illegal under international law, constituted unjustified aggression and would lead to the deaths of many civilians through the bombing campaign and by preventing humanitarian aid workers from bringing food into the country. By one estimate, around 5,000 Afghan civilians had been killed within just the first three months of the U.S. invasion.

More broadly, the invasion of Afghanistan appeared to opponents to be a stepping stone to the 2003 Iraq War, increasing the geo-political reach of the United States:

Involvement in an Afghan civil war

Opposition also stems from the view that the US-led military forces are taking sides in an ongoing civil war in Afghanistan between its ethnic groups, backing minority Tajiks and Uzbeks against the Pashtun majority of Afghanistan.

According to journalist Ahmed Rashid, author of several books on Afghanistan, the Taliban are in the fabric of that country, and defeating the Taliban would involve killing "large numbers of Pashtuns", an ethnic group with a long history in southeastern Afghanistan.

Afghan civilian opposition to the invasion
One of the best-known women's organization in Afghanistan, the Revolutionary Association of the Women of Afghanistan (RAWA), condemned the US invasion of Afghanistan, stating that "America ... has launched a vast aggression on our country". They accused the US and its allies of "paying the least attention to the fate of democracy in Afghanistan" by first having supported for years a "Jehadis-fostering, Osama-fostering and Taliban-fostering" policy before the 2001 US invasion, only to now be "sharpening the dagger of the Northern Alliance" warlords and drug lords that were key allies of the U.S. in its invasion.

In January 2009, an independent analysis by the Carnegie Endowment for International Peace in Washington, D.C. reported that "the majority of Afghans are now deeply opposed to the foreign troops on their soil" and that the presence of a foreign force in Afghanistan is the single most important factor behind the Afghan insurgency. However, according to a May 2009 BBC poll, 69% of Afghans surveyed thought it was at least mostly good that the U.S. military came into remove the Taliban and in a June 2009 Gallup survey found that about half of Afghan respondents felt that additional U.S. forces would help stabilize the security situation.

A key and long-standing point of Afghan opposition to the war in Afghanistan has been the constant raids of Afghan homes by foreign military forces that have persisted despite long-repeated pleas and protests by the Afghan government.

In a visit to Washington in May 2005, Afghan President Hamid Karzai asked U.S. President George W. Bush to let the Afghan government have authority over house search operations regularly conducted by the U.S.-led foreign military forces in his country. Bush rejected the Afghan president's request.

In September 2005, Karzai again tried asking the US-led military forces for changes, saying: "Going into the Afghan homes – searching Afghan homes without the authorization of the Afghan government – is something that should stop now. No coalition forces should go into Afghan homes without the authorization of the Afghan government."

Several weeks into a massive US-led military offensive against the Taliban in four southern Afghan provinces in 2006, Afghan President Hamid Karzai spoke against the killing of so many Afghan citizens:

By the spring of 2006, mounting anger over the foreign military raids of Afghan homes, and accusations of foreign troops molesting women during the forced searches, helped prompt Afghan religious leaders to begin calling for armed resistance.

In a December 2008 speech, Afghan President Hamid Karzai said that in the previous month he had again asked that the U.S. military in his country cooperate with his government, sending the U.S. government a list of demands about troop conduct in his country: "Part of that list was that they shouldn't, on their own, enter the houses of our people and bombard our villages and detain our people." He gave no indication of having received any response back from the U.S.

In November 2010, he yet again repeated his protest during a Washington Post interview: "The raids are a problem always. They were a problem then, they are a problem now. They have to go away. The Afghan people don't like these raids, if there is any raid it has to be done by the Afghan government within the Afghan laws. This is a continuing disagreement between us."

A 2010 government delegation led by President Hamid Karzai's advisor said that the foreign military forces had inflicted unreasonable damage and caused the displacement of many people.

International public opinion

International public opinion was largely opposed to the war in Afghanistan. Polls around the world – including a 47-nation global survey in 2007, a 24-nation survey in 2008, both a 25-nation survey and a 13-nation survey in 2009, and a 22-nation survey in 2010 – showed considerable opposition to the presence of US and NATO military troops in Afghanistan.

While support for the war in Afghanistan was strongest in the United States and Israel, later showed growing American opposition to the U.S. war, including majority opposition:
 September 2009 – United States: Growing American opposition to the war in Afghanistan reached an all-time high, while support for the U.S. war fell to an all-time low in September. A record majority 58% of Americans now oppose the war in Afghanistan, while only 39% support the U.S. war. The CNN – Opinion Research poll was conducted September 11–13, 2009.
 September 2009 – United States: "Americans are broadly skeptical of President Obama's contention that the war in Afghanistan is necessary for the war against terrorism to be a success, and few see an increase in troops as the right thing to do." The plurality 42% of Americans want a reduction of the number of U.S. troops in Afghanistan. Only 26% of Americans think more troops should be sent to Afghanistan. 51% of Americans think the war is not worth fighting, while 46% think it is. Fewer than half of Americans think winning the war in Afghanistan is necessary to win the "war on terrorism", with about as many saying it is not. The Washington Post – ABC News poll was conducted September 10–12, 2009.

International protests against the war

The ongoing decade-long War in Afghanistan has repeatedly been the subject of large protests around the world, with the first large-scale demonstrations beginning in the days leading up to the war's official launch on October 7, 2001, as US "Operation Enduring Freedom".

Rejection of the terrorism argument

A Washington Post – ABC News poll in September 2009 reported that "Americans are broadly skeptical of President Obama's contention that the war in Afghanistan is necessary for the war against terrorism to be a success." Fewer than half of Americans think winning the war in Afghanistan is necessary to win the "war on terrorism", with about as many saying that it is not.

A poll at the end of August 2009 found that three-quarters of Britons do not think fighting in Afghanistan makes British people, or British streets, any safer from terrorism, as Gordon Brown and senior ministers repeatedly told them to justify the war.

About a week and a half later, British member of parliament Eric Joyce, a former army major, resigned as aide to Defence Secretary Bob Ainsworth, saying "I do not think the public will accept for much longer that our losses can be justified by simply referring to the risk of greater terrorism on our streets."

In an influential September 2009 article entitled "Time to Get Out of Afghanistan", conservative commentator George Will similarly argued that "forces should be substantially reduced", and "America should do only what can be done from offshore, using intelligence, drones, cruise missiles, airstrikes and small, potent Special Forces units" in targeted operations.

U.S. Vice President Joe Biden and a number of other senior administration officials also favored moving toward a more scaled-back strategy that focuses on targeted, surgical operations against senior insurgent figures using drones and small special operations teams.

Others have further made the point that al-Qaeda does not need a safe haven at all, and that terrorists can and have learned their craft in a Hamburg apartment, a home in Colorado, a flight school in Florida, or myriad other places around the world.

In his September 10, 2009 letter of resignation as the State Department's Senior Civilian Representative in Zabul Province, Afghanistan, in protest against the American war in Afghanistan, Matthew Hoh, a former U.S. Marine captain, stated:

In a September 16, 2009 Washington Post article, Paul R. Pillar, deputy chief of the counterterrorist center at the CIA from 1997 to 1999 and director of graduate studies at Georgetown University's Security Studies Program, questioned the assumption that al-Qaeda or other terrorist groups need a haven at all, pointing out that "terrorists' organizations have become more network-like, not beholden to any one headquarters."

In a September 30, 2009 open letter to President Obama, foreign policy veteran William R. Polk stated: "Since terrorist attacks can be mounted from many places, the only effective long-term defense against them is to deal with their causes."

A decade into the war, the Pew Research Center reported in September 2011 that the majority 75% of Americans do not think the war in Afghanistan has lessened the risk of terrorism in their country, and only a minority 25% thought it had. Far more Americans, the plurality 37%, think the U.S. war in Afghanistan has in fact increased the likelihood of terrorist attacks in the U.S.

Military critics
The Pew Research Center reported in February 2009: "As has been the case since 2006, more Americans believe decreasing – rather than increasing – the U.S. military presence abroad is the more effective way to reduce the threat of terrorist attacks on the United States. Half of Americans (50%) now believe that decreasing the U.S. military presence overseas would be the more effective policy, while just 31% say an increased presence would be more effective."

In his September 10, 2009 letter resigning over the American war in Afghanistan, which he had come to believe simply fueled the insurgency, Matthew Hoh, the State Department's Senior Civilian Representative in Zabul Province, wrote: "The Pashtun insurgency, which is composed of multiple, seemingly infinite, local groups, is fed by what is perceived by the Pashtun people as a continued and sustained assault, going back centuries, on Pashtun land, culture, traditions and religion by internal and external enemies. The U.S. and NATO presence and operations in Pashtun valleys and villages, as well as Afghan army and police units that are led and composed of non-Pashtun soldiers and police, provide an occupation force against which the insurgency is justified."

As with the Carnegie Endowment for International Peace, he advised that the U.S. reduce its combat forces in Afghanistan, if not remove them entirely.

In a statement made to New York Times columnist Nicholas Kristof, a group of former intelligence officials and other experts decided to go public with their concerns and warned:

The group included Howard Hart, a former CIA station chief in Pakistan who helped organize the anti-Soviet insurgency in the 1980s; David Miller, a former ambassador and National Security Council official; William J. Olson, a counterinsurgency scholar at the National Defense University; and another CIA veteran who spent 12 years in the region, was station chief in Kabul at the time the Soviets invaded Afghanistan in 1979, and later headed the CIA's Counterterrorism Center.

In the 2009 documentary Rethink Afghanistan, several other former U.S. intelligence officials and experts on Afghanistan also contend that the war in Afghanistan does nothing to protect the safety of American people, but, on the contrary, only threatens the safety and security of Americans, both in the U.S. and abroad:

In his September 30, 2009 open letter to President Obama, foreign policy veteran William R. Polk argued that trying to defeat the Taliban militarily is not in America's interest, saying: "The harder we try, the more likely terrorism will be to increase and spread."

Comparisons to the Soviet–Afghan War

In November 1986, with 109,000 troops in Afghanistan and the war soon heading into an 8th year, the military counter-insurgency was not working. Marshal Sergei Akhromeyev, commander of Soviet armed forces, was summoned to report on the situation to the USSR's politburo in the Kremlin. His strong assessment was that the army needed more resources, and he warned that without more men and equipment "this war will continue for a very long time". By the peak of the Soviet deployment in 1987, Moscow had 140,000 troops in Afghanistan.

In September 2009, with 108,000 to 110,000 foreign troops in Afghanistan under U.S. command and the war soon heading into a 9th year, the military counter-insurgency was not working. A 66-page report by U.S. general Stanley McChrystal to the White House administration on the situation in Afghanistan, leaked in advance of an anticipated troop request, gave his strong assessment that more troops and resources were needed. McChrystal warned: "Resources will not win this war, but under-resourcing could lose it. Failure to provide adequate resources also risks a longer conflict, greater casualties, higher overall costs and ultimately, a critical loss of political support. Any of these risks, in turn, are likely to result in mission failure." After officially receiving McChrystal's request for more troops, U.S. president Barack Obama would announce that some 30,000 more U.S. troops would be sent to Afghanistan over the course of the following year.

McChrystal, the U.S. general, at the same time called for a new strategy of pulling troops from sparsely populated rural areas to concentrate on defending higher population urban areas. Tom Coghlan of The Times observed: "Students of Afghan history may note that this strategic conclusion was one previously reached by the Soviets, who also switched to a strategy of ceding remote areas and only defending population centres and the country's main arteries in 1986."

On July 20, 1987, the withdrawal of Soviet troops from Afghanistan was announced, and within a little over a year and a half the Soviet withdrawal from Afghanistan was completed.

Comparisons to the Vietnam War
The two decade-long war in Afghanistan has often been compared unfavorably to the Vietnam War, and characterized as a quagmire.

In the spring of 2010, the war in Afghanistan surpassed the length of official United States participation in the Vietnam War, 8 years and 5 months, as the longest-running U.S. war ever.

In September 2009, an article by the New York Times Frank Rich noted a new aspect in the strong parallels between the wars, the eerie similarity between the political maneuvers in 2009 and a half-century before, when John F. Kennedy was weighing whether to send combat troops to Vietnam. "Military leaders lobbied for their new mission by planting leaks in the press." The Secretaries of Defense (Robert McNamara) and State, as well as the Joint Chief of Staff and the president's special military adviser all supported sending combat troops, while Kennedy himself had reservations.

Growing U.S. opposition to the war in Afghanistan

In March 2009, a bipartisan group of 14 members of the United States House of Representatives – Walter Jones, Ron Paul, Dennis Kucinich, Neil Abercrombie, Roscoe Bartlett, Steve Kagen, Ed Whitfield, Lynn Woolsey, Bob Filner, Jim McGovern, Howard Coble, John Conyers, Marcy Kaptur, John Duncan, and Michael Michaud – signed a letter to President Obama urging him to reconsider his decision to send 17,000 more U.S. troops, and to "resist pressure to escalate further".

Their letter to Obama argued that the military escalation could be counterproductive to creating stability in Afghanistan and could harm U.S. security, noting that a recent Carnegie Endowment study had concluded that "The only meaningful way to halt the insurgency's momentum is to start withdrawing troops. The presence of foreign troops is the most important element driving the resurgence of the Taliban."

In September and October 2009, with U.S. military leaders requesting yet more troops – and polls showing the majority of American people opposed to the U.S. war in Afghanistan and to sending any more troops, more members of the United States House of Representatives and other leaders began to speak for and manifest their constituents' opposition.

On September 10, 2009, Speaker of the United States House of Representatives Nancy Pelosi stated: "I don't think there is a great deal of support for sending more troops to Afghanistan in the country or in the Congress.".

Senator Carl Levin, chairman of the Senate Armed Services Committee, stated: "There's a significant number of people in the country, and I don't know the exact percentages, that have questions about deepening our military involvement in Afghanistan."

Senator Russell D. Feingold, a senior member of the Senate Foreign Relations Committee urged discussion of a timeline for ending American involvement in Afghanistan.

Senator Dianne Feinstein, chairwoman of the Senate Intelligence Committee stated: "I do not believe we can build a democratic state in Afghanistan. I believe it will remain a tribal entity", adding that she wanted the U.S. military mission to "be time-limited".

Senator Richard Durbin, assistant majority leader in the Senate, said: "Sending additional troops would not be the right thing to do."

In September 2009, Senator John F. Kerry, chairman of the Senate Foreign Relations Committee and a veteran and protester of the Vietnam War, warned of repeating the mistakes of Vietnam and said that the United States needed to have an exit strategy.

Former Secretary of State Colin L. Powell, a retired four-star Army general, expressed skepticism that more troops would guarantee success.

On October 4, 2009, Representative Barbara Lee with 21 other members of the United States House of Representatives introduced a bill, H.R. 3699, to prohibit any funding to increase the U.S. military buildup in Afghanistan beyond its current level.

On October 8, 2009, key Democrats on Capitol Hill warned that a decision by President Obama to send more U.S. troops to Afghanistan could trigger a revolt within his own party, possibly including an attempt to cut off funds for the controversial military buildup.

Representative David R. Obey, chairman of the U.S. House Appropriations Committee stated: "I believe we need to more narrowly focus our efforts and have a much more achievable and targeted policy in that region. Otherwise we run the risk of repeating the mistakes we made in Vietnam and the Russians made in Afghanistan."

Representative John P. Murtha, also on the House Appropriations Committee and an influential voice on military affairs, stated: "The public is worn out by war. The troops, no matter what the military says, are exhausted."

Senator Russell D. Feingold, a member of both the Senate Foreign Relations Committee and Senate Intelligence Committee, stated that if Obama decides to send more troops, the House of Representatives should contest it.

Senator Feingold, who favors a timetable for withdrawal and opposes McChrystal's troop surge, said in an interview that his constituents were weary of war and were in "almost unanimous agreement" that "we've stayed there a long time and we need to figure out appropriately what we can accomplish."

On October 15, 2009, Senator Robert Byrd, in an emotional speech on the floor of the U.S. Senate, suggested that the eight-year-old U.S. war in Afghanistan had become lost in some broader scheme of nation-building. Referring to "mission creep" in Afghanistan, he said:

On October 27, 2009, the Washington Post reported that a U.S. official in Afghanistan had resigned in protest over the U.S. war, in a move that sent ripples all the way to the White House. Matthew Hoh, a State Department Foreign Service officer serving as the Senior Civilian Representative in Zabul Province submitted his resignation on September 10, with a letter outlining the reasons for which he felt he had to resign over the war, writing, "I fail to see the value or the worth in continued U.S. casualties or expenditures or resources in support of the Afghan government in what is, truly, a 35-year old civil war."

On November 4, 2009, U.S. Congress Rep. Eric Massa spoke before the U.S. House of Representatives to say enough is enough in Afghanistan. He stated: "Today is the 2,950th day of this war. It has cost us $300 billion, $3,947 per American family. Enough is enough. It is time to bring our troops home. ... the deployment of additional troops in Afghanistan and the continuation of this conflict is both not in the interest of our Nation, and, in fact, is on par with a potential error the size of our initial invasion in Iraq."

In November 2009, the U.S. ambassador to Afghanistan, Lt.-Gen. Karl Eikenberry, the retired army general who commanded U.S. forces in Afghanistan in 2005–2007, warned President Obama against committing tens of thousands of extra troops to Afghanistan. His dramatic intervention into the debate on a troop surge reportedly infuriated U.S. General McChrystal, the commander of all foreign military forces in Afghanistan who had been requesting another 40,000 troops.

In April 2010, Democratic Congressman Jim McGovern, Republican Congressman Walter Jones, and Democratic Senator Russ Feingold introduced legislation demanding an exit strategy and a timetable for withdrawal of the American military forces and military contractors in Afghanistan. While noting Obama's promise to begin bringing some troops back in July 2010, Rep. McGovern said: "It's not only important to know when the first soldier is to be redeployed or brought home, it's important to know when the last soldier is as well."

On July 1, 2010, 60% of Democratic representatives in the House voted in favor of the legislation to require a timetable and plan for the withdrawal of U.S. troops from Afghanistan. In all, 153 Democrats and 9 Republicans voted for the amendment. 93 Democrats and 7 Republicans also voted for an amendment from Rep. Barbara Lee that would have required the war funds to be spent only on withdrawing troops from Afghanistan. Nearly all Republicans opposed the amendments however, and neither passed.

In January 2011, Republican figure Grover Norquist, founder of Americans for Tax Reform, called on conservatives to have a conversation on the possibility of withdrawing from Afghanistan. He called attention to a nationwide poll of conservatives that showed that the majority 71% of self-identified conservative voters, including over two-thirds (67%) of Tea Party supporters, are worried about the war's cost to taxpayers, and stated that, given the war's enormous price tag, it was time to consider leaving.

The same nationwide poll of conservatives, conducted in early January 2011, found that the majority two-thirds of conservative and Tea Party supporters call for a reduction of U.S. troop levels in Afghanistan (39% plurality) or a complete withdrawal from Afghanistan "as soon as possible" (27%). Only a minority 24% of conservative and Tea Party supporters think that the current levels of troops should be maintained.

In February 2011, a bipartisan group of U.S. lawmakers again introduced legislation to end combat operations in Afghanistan and reduce spending of U.S. taxpayer dollars on the war. Led by Republican Congressmen Ron Paul of Texas, Walter Jones of North Carolina, and Democratic Congresswoman Barbara Lee of California, the amendment had 45 other co-sponsors. Republican congressmen opposed to the continued large-scale combat operations in Afghanistan convened a meeting for GOP members which had as principle speakers Americans for Tax Reform President Grover Norquist, Maj. Gen. John Batiste (ret.) and Lt. Col. Eric Egland (Reserve), a career intelligence officer with experience in Afghanistan, Pakistan, and Iraq. According to numerous polls, the majority of Americans now want a faster withdrawal from Afghanistan.

In February 2011, the Democratic National Committee passed a resolution calling for an acceleration of the U.S. withdrawal from Afghanistan. Citing the Gallup poll released that month that found that the strong majority 72% of Americans favor action to "speed up the withdrawal of troops from Afghanistan", the policy resolution called for "a swift withdrawal of US armed forces and military contractors in Afghanistan which must include a significant and sizable reduction no later than July 2011."

Concerns that the war could derail Obama's presidency
Many that have hopes in President Obama's presidency but oppose the war in Afghanistan are concerned that the war could derail plans for his presidency the way the Vietnam War ruined the presidency of Lyndon B. Johnson.

Speaking against the war in Afghanistan, Senator Russ Feingold said: "It doesn't make sense in the long run. It's going to be bad for the president politically, as well as being a very unwise policy in terms of our national security."

See also
 International public opinion on the war in Afghanistan
 Protests against the war in Afghanistan
 Civilian casualties in the war in Afghanistan (2001–2021)
 Coalition casualties in Afghanistan
 Canadian Afghan detainee abuse scandal
 Bagram torture and prisoner abuse
 Criticism of the War on Terrorism
 Afghanistan conflict (1978–present)
 Opposition to the Iraq War

References

 
Afghanistan War